Rob McIntyre (born 10 March 1956) is an Australian alpine skier. He competed at the 1976 Winter Olympics and the 1980 Winter Olympics.

References

1956 births
Living people
Australian male alpine skiers
Olympic alpine skiers of Australia
Alpine skiers at the 1976 Winter Olympics
Alpine skiers at the 1980 Winter Olympics
Place of birth missing (living people)